Surry County Public Schools is a Virginia school division serving Surry County, Virginia. 

The public schools include:

Surry County High School
Luther Porter Jackson Middle School
Surry Elementary School

External links

Surry County Public Schools

Education in Surry County, Virginia
School divisions in Virginia